The Antioch Review is an American literary magazine established in 1941 at Antioch College in Ohio. The magazine was published on a quarterly basis. One of the oldest continuously published literary magazines in the United States prior to it being put on hiatus by the college in 2020, it published fiction, essays, and poetry from both emerging and established authors.

About
The Antioch Review was founded in 1940 by small group of Antioch College faculty who sought to establish a forum for the voice of liberalism in a world facing the forces of fascism and communism. The first publication was released in 1941. In its early years, it was edited by collective, among whom were Paul Bixler and George Geiger, and later Paul Rohmann.

The magazine continued to publish despite the 2008-2011 closing of Antioch College (which reopened in 2011).

While its pages have been populated by innumerous academics, The Antioch Review does not publish footnotes, thus their contributions have been largely non- (rather than anti-) academic and journalistic in nature. See  Among the magazine's notable contributions, it published an article by Robert K. Merton in 1948 that introduced the world to the concept of the "self-fulfilling prophecy."

Dr. Robert S. (Bob) Fogarty, who joined the Antioch faculty in 1968 and was editor of The Antioch Review from 1977, received the PEN/Nora Magid Award for Magazine Editing in 2003.

Free speech is taken seriously at The Antioch Review.  The Winter 2016 issue published an article considered offensive to many transgender individuals and supporters, but was nevertheless defended against a wave of criticism on the grounds of free expression of ideas and opinions, even when they run counter to one’s own.

As of October 2020, publication of the Review “just sort of stopped,” according to the magazine’s long-time production editor Jane Baker; and, the college did not respond regarding the future of the Review when queried by editor Fogarty, who had been furloughed since April 2020.  In August, Fogarty and Ben Zitsman, the magazine's managing editor, incorporated a nonprofit called the Antioch Review Foundation to raise funds and be in a position to take responsibility for the publication from the college, but were served a cease-and-desist order barring their use of the magazine name without involvement of the college, and any other actions relating to the Review.  The college subsequently said that because of the college’s financial challenges, the publication was being put on hiatus after the Winter 2020 issue (which saw delayed publication during the Summer of 2020) while the college explored options.  Fogarty's title as Editor was officially removed in June, 2021, when the college retitled him as Editor Emeritus of the publication.  He died two months later.

As of 2023, the publication was still on hiatus, with no decision on its future being reported on the official Antioch College website.

See also
List of literary magazines

References

External links 
The Antioch Review official site

Literary magazines published in the United States
Quarterly magazines published in the United States
Magazines established in 1941
Magazines published in Ohio
Antioch College